Michael S. Harrison is an American police officer who currently serves as commissioner of the Baltimore Police Department. He was formerly the Superintendent of the New Orleans Police Department from August 2014 to January 2019.  On August 18, 2014, he was appointed by New Orleans Mayor Mitch Landrieu as interim superintendent following the retirement of the previous Superintendent Ronal W. Serpas.  On October 14, 2014, Harrison was formally named by Mayor Landrieu as Superintendent of Police.

Commissioner Harrison, a 1987 graduate of McDonogh 35 High School, joined the New Orleans Police Department in 1991. He quickly advanced through the ranks of the department, becoming a detective in the Major Case Narcotics Section in 1995, Sergeant in the Eighth Police District in 1999, Supervisor in the NOPD Public Integrity Bureau in 2000 and Seventh District Assistant Commander in 2009. From January 2011 to 2012, he served as Commander of the Special Investigations Division in which he managed the narcotics, vice, criminal intelligence and gang enforcement units of NOPD. With nearly 23 years of service, Harrison most recently served as Commander of Seventh District, overseeing police services for eastern New Orleans since January 2012.

Under his watch, the Seventh District experienced crime reductions in 2012 and 2013. He helped craft and testified in favor of legislation to enable better enforcement of prostitution and solicitation, which was a major problem in the district.

Prior to joining the NOPD, Harrison served eight years with the Louisiana Air National Guard. He received a bachelor's degree in criminal justice from the University of Phoenix, a Master of Criminal Justice from Loyola University New Orleans. He is a graduate of Northwestern University's School of Police Staff and Command and the Senior Management Institute for Police. He is a member of the International Association of Chiefs of Police, Major City Chiefs Association and the Police Executive Research Forum. Harrison, a resident of Algiers, also serves as an elder at City of Love Church in New Orleans.  Harrison has been married to his high school sweetheart since 1992 and they have 2 children. On January 8, 2019, Harrison was nominated by Baltimore Mayor Catherine Pugh to become the Police Commissioner of the Baltimore Police Department.

References

http://media.nola.com/crime_impact/other/SNOLA%20Conte14081811210.pdf
http://www.nola.gov/nopd/about-us/superintendent-of-police/

External links

Living people
Commissioners of the Baltimore Police Department
Chiefs of the New Orleans Police Department
University of Phoenix alumni
Loyola University New Orleans alumni
Year of birth missing (living people)